The 1972–73 Scottish Cup was the 88th staging of Scotland's most prestigious football knockout competition. The Cup was won by Rangers who defeated Celtic in the final.

First round

Replays

Second round

Replays

Third round

Replays

Fourth round

Replays

Quarter-finals

Replays

Semi-finals

Replays

Final

Teams

See also

1972–73 in Scottish football
1972–73 Scottish League Cup

Scottish Cup seasons
1972–73 in Scottish football
Scot